Kalateh-ye Firuzeh (also Romanized as Kalāteh-ye Fīrūzeh; also known as Fīrūzeh) is a village in Ziarat Rural District, in the Central District of Shirvan County, North Khorasan Province, Iran. At the 2006 census, its population was 178, in 45 families.

References 

Populated places in Shirvan County